Guillermo Allison Revuelta (born 25 September 1990) is a Mexican professional footballer who plays as a goalkeeper. His debut for Cruz Azul in the Liga MX was in a game against Toluca where he blocked the penalty in the last play of the game which gave Cruz Azul the win, 2–1.

Honours
Cruz Azul
Copa MX: Apertura 2018
Supercopa MX: 2019
Leagues Cup: 2019

References

External links

Living people
1990 births
Association football goalkeepers
Cruz Azul footballers
Cruz Azul Hidalgo footballers
Liga MX players
Ascenso MX players
Liga Premier de México players
Tercera División de México players
Footballers from Chiapas
Mexican footballers
People from Tuxtla Gutiérrez